Thomas William Randall (born 4 July 1981) is a British Conservative Party politician who has been Member of Parliament (MP) for Gedling since the 2019 general election. Randall is a member of the 1922 Committee.

Early life
Randall was born and grew up in Arnold, Nottinghamshire, where he attended Redhill Academy. He studied law at Oxford University, going on to practise as a solicitor for two years. He worked for a professional membership body before becoming an MP. He was diagnosed with Ankylosing spondylitis at the age of 16.

Political career
Randall contested the local government election in 2018 for Tower Hamlets but fell seven votes short of winning one of the two Canary Wharf seats.

Randall was selected to contest the Gedling seat by the Conservative Party for the 2019 general election. He went on to defeat the sitting Labour MP Vernon Coaker and win the seat with a majority of 1.4%, or 679 votes. This made the seat one of the most marginal in the country.

Electoral history

2019 general election

2018 Tower Hamlets London Borough Council elections

References

External links
Official website

Living people
Alumni of the University of Oxford
Alumni of Christ Church, Oxford
UK MPs 2019–present
Conservative Party (UK) MPs for English constituencies
People from Arnold, Nottinghamshire
1981 births